Commonly used to describe the Napoleonic era British foot soldiers, the British Regulars were known for their distinct red uniform and well-disciplined combat performance. Known famously in British folklore as the Red Coats, these hardened soldiers were the backbone of the British Army in the eighteenth and nineteenth centuries.

There are several possible reasons why the British Army outfitted its Regulars in red. The most commonly stated reason is that it would hide the appearance of blood on the battlefield, possibly demoralizing the troops. This is unlikely because blood would show black on the red serge tunics, and the white, or "buff" trousers that were commonly issued would hide no blood at all. Another possible explanation would be that red dye was relatively cheap, allowing the Army to give its troops better equipment without wasting money on more expensive dyes. Another good reason could be that British officers needed to be able to identify their men in heavy smoke. Red would show better through gunsmoke than most other colors. A final possibility is that red is the primary color in the Royal Standard, the Royal Coat of Arms, and is the color of St George's cross (St George is the patron saint of England).

During the Napoleonic Wars, the British Regulars were a well disciplined group of foot soldiers with years of combat experience, including in the Americas, the Irish Rebellion of 1798 and the War of 1812. Around half of the British Regular "Redcoats", most were between the ages of 18 to 29; and an over sixth-tenths of the regulars were five feet, four inches, to five feet seven inches. The British Government at the time, did not allow enlisted men to be older than 45 years old.

Although typically under English command, many of the enlisted Regulars were either Scottish or Irish. A small number of Regulars were from Prussia and other states within the German Confederation. From these multiple origins, also came the two different "Schools of Thought", the 'American' and the 'German'.

The American school focused on open-formation light infantry tactics that were well suited for areas of rigid terrain, and dense forested areas, best suited against enemies that had no cavalry nor artillery. The 'American' school favored infantry ranks of two deep, and use of light infantry with rifles. The German school focused on disciplined, close-drill order, well suited for the vast Central Plains of Europe. This approach was preferred in large battlefields where the enemy had large numbers of cavalry plus artillery. The 'German' school favored infantry ranks of three deep, and the use of smooth bore muskets.

After 1855, starting in India and gradually extending to other colonial outposts, the scarlet uniforms were often replaced with khaki on campaign for tactical reasons i.e. camouflage. However, not until 1902, and the introduction of a universal khaki service dress, would scarlet be officially abandoned as campaign dress for European operations. The classical British Regular was most famous for his action in the Battle of Culloden, the Seven Years' War (1756–1763), the American Revolutionary War (1775–1783), the Peninsular War (1808–1815), the War of 1812 (1812–1814), and the Waterloo campaign (1815).

Bibliography
 http://www.americanrevolution.org/britsol.html
 https://web.archive.org/web/20050401063844/http://www.national-army-museum.ac.uk/

19th-century history of the British Army